The Thirty-Ninth Wisconsin Legislature convened from  to  in regular session.

This was the first legislative session after the redistricting of the Senate and Assembly according to an act of the previous session.

Senators representing even-numbered districts were newly elected for this session and were serving the first two years of a four-year term. Assembly members were elected to a two-year term. Assembly members and even-numbered senators were elected in the general election of November 6, 1888. Senators representing odd-numbered districts were serving the third and fourth year of a four-year term, having been elected in the general election of November 2, 1886.

Major events
 January 7, 1889: Inauguration of William D. Hoard as the 16th Governor of Wisconsin.
 March 4, 1889: Inauguration of Benjamin Harrison as the 23rd President of the United States
 April 2, 1889: At the state's spring general election, Wisconsin voters approved an amendment to the Constitution of Wisconsin which abolished the separate offices of "chief justice" and "associate justices" of the Wisconsin Supreme Court, converting all members to "justices" and designating that the most senior justice would serve as chief justice.
 May 1889: First reported cases associated with the 1889–1890 pandemic.
 November 8, 1889: Montana was admitted as the 41st U.S. state.
 November 11, 1889: Washington was admitted as the 42nd U.S. state.
 March 18, 1890: The Wisconsin Supreme Court published it's decision in State ex rel. Weiss v. District Board of School District No. Eight, also known as the Edgerton Bible Case.  The Court ruled that the use of the bible in public school instruction was an unconstitutional merging of church and state.  This decision was later cited by the United States Supreme Court in its 1963 decision banning compulsory prayer in schools.
 March 20, 1890: The new German Emperor Wilhelm II dismissed long-time German chancellor Otto von Bismarck.
 May 1, 1890: Coordinated mass rallies and strikes were held in the United States to call for an eight-hour workday.
 July 2, 1890: U.S. President Benjamin Harrison signed the Sherman Antitrust Act of 1890 into law.
 July 3, 1890: Idaho was admitted as the 43rd U.S. state.
 July 10, 1890: Wyoming was admitted as the 44th U.S. state.
 July 14, 1890: U.S. President Benjamin Harrison signed the Sherman Silver Purchase Act into law.  The law increased the amount of silver the U.S. government would purchase, in order to encourage inflation.
 October 1, 1890: U.S. President Benjamin Harrison signed the Tariff Act of 1890, raising the average tariff on imports to 50%.
 November 4, 1890: George Wilbur Peck elected Governor of Wisconsin.
 December 29, 1890: The 7th U.S. Cavalry Regiment killed 153 Lakota Sioux at Wounded Knee, South Dakota, in an incident known as the Wounded Knee Massacre.

Major legislation
 April 18, 1889: An Act concerning the education and employment of children, 1889 Act 519. Referred to as the "Bennett Law".  The main purpose of the act was to raise the minimum employment age from 12 to 13 and required parents and guardians to ensure that children between the ages of 7 and 14 were receiving at least 12 weeks of education per year.  "Section 5" of the act defined a "school" as only one which provided instructions solely in the English language.  This proved to be a highly controversial move in a state which had many German, Polish, and Scandinavian language schools.  The backlash against the law likely contributed significantly to the Democratic wave election in 1890.
 Joint Resolution agreeing to a proposed amendment to the constitution, 1889 Joint Resolution 3. This was the required second legislative passage of a proposed amendment to the Wisconsin Constitution to abolish the separate offices of "chief justice" and "associate justices" of the Wisconsin Supreme Court and instead define all members of the court as "justices" with the most senior justice acting as "chief justice".  This amendment was ratified by voters at the 1889 spring general election.
 Joint Resolution proposing an amendment to section 1, of article 10, of the constitution of the state of Wisconsin, relating to Education, 1889 Joint Resolution 7.  This was another attempt to amend the section of the Constitution of Wisconsin dealing with the Superintendent of Public Instruction.  The previous attempt had just been defeated in an 1888 referendum.

Party summary

Senate summary

Assembly summary

Sessions
 1st Regular session: January 9, 1889April 19, 1889

Leaders

Senate leadership
 President of the Senate: George W. Ryland (R)
 President pro tempore: Thomas A. Dyson (R)

Assembly leadership
 Speaker of the Assembly: Thomas B. Mills (R)

Members

Members of the Senate
Members of the Senate for the Thirty-Ninth Wisconsin Legislature:

Members of the Assembly
Members of the Assembly for the Thirty-Ninth Wisconsin Legislature:

Committees

Senate committees
 Senate Committee on AgricultureS. B. Stanchfield, chair
 Senate Committee on Assessment and Collection of TaxesJ. E. Leahy, chair
 Senate Committee on EducationC. Widule, chair
 Senate Committee on Enrolled BillsJ. W. DeGroff, chair
 Senate Committee on Engrossed BillsP. J. Clawson, chair
 Senate Committee on Federal RelationsH. A. Cooper, chair
 Senate Committee on Finance, Banks, and InsuranceG. H. Buckstaff, chair
 Senate Committee on IncorporationsW. A. Rust, chair
 Senate Committee on the JudiciaryGeorge F. Merrill, chair
 Senate Committee on Legislative ExpendituresW. S. Main, chair
 Senate Committee on Manufacturing and CommerceH. A. Taylor, chair
 Senate Committee on Military AffairsE. Scofield, chair
 Senate Committee on Privileges and ElectionsE. Scofield, chair
 Senate Committee on Public LandsR. E. Joiner, chair
 Senate Committee on RailroadsGeorge Fitch, chair
 Senate Committee on Roads and BridgesFrank Avery, chair
 Senate Committee on State AffairsA. P. Lovejoy, chair
 Senate Committee on Town and County OrganizationsJ. C. Reynolds, chair

Assembly committees
 Assembly Committee on AgricultureE. Beaumont, chair
 Assembly Committee on Assessment and Collection of TaxesJ. W. Whelan, chair
 Assembly Committee on Bills on their Third ReadingHugh Porter, chair
 Assembly Committee on CitiesH. E. Legler, chair
 Assembly Committee on EducationM. J. Bennett, chair
 Assembly Committee on Engrossed BillsH. G. Klinefelter, chair
 Assembly Committee on Enrolled BillsC. F. Simmons, chair
 Assembly Committee on Federal RelationsJames W. Freeman, chair
 Assembly Committee on IncorporationsJ. W. Babcock, chair
 Assembly Committee on Insurance, Banks, and BankingW. H. Blyton, chair
 Assembly Committee on the JudiciaryW. J. McElroy, chair
 Assembly Committee on Legislative ExpendituresDwight S. Allen, chair
 Assembly Committee on Labor and ManufacturesV. W. Dorwin, chair
 Assembly Committee on Lumber and MiningJ. H. McCourt, chair
 Assembly Committee on Medical SocietiesR. H. Delap, chair
 Assembly Committee on MilitiaJ. B. McCoy, chair
 Assembly Committee on Privileges and ElectionsW. B. La Selle, chair
 Assembly Committee on Public ImprovementsK. K. Hagestad, chair
 Assembly Committee on Public LandsC. F. Mohr, chair
 Assembly Committee on RailroadsR. W. Jackson, chair
 Assembly Committee on Roads and BridgesJohn Stevenson, chair
 Assembly Committee on State AffairsH. M. Stocking, chair
 Assembly Committee on Town and County OrganizationCharles Hall, chair
 Assembly Committee on Ways and MeansE. C. Oliver, chair
 Assembly Special Committee on Labor and IndustriesHenry Siebers, chair

Joint committees
 Joint Committee on Charitable and Penal InstitutionsL. E. Pond (Sen.) & R. B. Showalter (Asm.), co-chairs
 Joint Committee on ClaimsE. I. Kidd (Sen.) & Evan Coolidge (Asm.), co-chairs
 Joint Committee on PrintingC. A. Pettibone (Sen.) & E. McGlachlin (Asm.), co-chairs

Changes from the 38th Legislature
New districts for the 39th Legislature were defined in 1887 Wisconsin Act 461, passed into law in the 38th Wisconsin Legislature.

Senate redistricting

Summary of changes
 11 Senate districts were left unchanged (or were only renumbered).
 Milwaukee County went from having 3 districts to 4 (4, 5, 6, 7).
 Waukesha County was divided between two multi-county districts with Jefferson (23) and with Washington and Ozaukee (33).
 Marathon County was divided between two multi-county districts with Green Lake, Portage, and Waushara (9) and with Shawano and Waupaca (21).
 Eau Claire and Jackson became a shared district (25) after having been in separate multi-county districts.
 Pierce and St. Croix became a shared district (10) after having been in separate multi-county districts.
 Crawford, Grant, La Crosse, and Vernon went from sharing 3 districts to 2 (16, 31).
 Manitowoc County went from having its own district to sharing a district with Kewaunee County (15).
 Brown County went from having its own district to sharing a district with Calumet County (2).

Partisan implications
 Republicans had 13 safe seats, down from 18.
 Democrats had 5 safe seats, down from 6.
 15 seats were competitive, up from 9.

Senate districts

Assembly redistricting

Summary of changes
 42 districts were left unchanged (or were only renumbered).
 Barron County became its own district after previously having been in a shared district with Bayfield, Burnett, Douglas, and Washburn counties.
 Dane County went from having 5 districts to 4.
 Dodge County went from having 4 districts to 3.
 Eau Claire County went from having 1 district to 2.
 La Crosse County went from having 1 district to 2.
 Marathon County went from having 1 district to 2.
 Oconto County became its own district after previously having been in a shared district with Forest and Langlade counties
 Racine County went from having 2 districts to 1.
 Washington County went from having 2 districts to 1.
 Waukesha County went from having 1 district to 2.

Assembly districts

Employees

Senate employees
 Chief Clerk: Charles E. Bross
 1st Assistant Clerk: J. O. Warriner
 2nd Assistant Clerk: J. S. Parkinson
 Bookkeeper: J. T. Huntington
 Engrossing Clerk: J. C. Bishop
 Enrolling Clerk: C. A. Christiansen
 Transcribing Clerk: F. W. Sacket
 Proofreader: J. J. Esch
 Index Clerk: Grace Winfield Bross
 Clerk for the Judiciary Committee: Linton McNeel
 Clerk for the Committee on Incorporations: Levi Earle Pond
 Clerk for the Committee on Claims: L. B. Noyes
 Clerk for the Committee on Engrossed Bills: Charles H. Barnett
 Clerk for the Committee on Enrolled Bills: Tobias Voegeli
 Clerk for the Committee on Railroads: J. T. Ellerson
 Document Clerk: K. W. Jensen
 Sergeant-at-Arms: T. J. George
 Assistant Sergeant-at-Arms: A. Townsend
 Postmaster: H. Stone Richardson
 Assistant Postmaster: J. O. Newgard
 Gallery Attendant: A. W. Wineberg
 Document Room Attendant: Jesse Kevill
 Committee Room Attendants:
 Fred O. De Groff
 L. Blackstone
 Comparing Clerks:
 Mrs. M. M. Fowler
 R. W. Cheever
 John Ashton
 Doorkeepers:
 E. W. Cole
 H. C. Folz
 J. M. Schweern
 J. F. Nelson
 Porter: John Malone
 Night Watch: B. H. Bronson
 Janitor: M. Thronson
 Messengers:
 Clarence Taylor
 Willie Leahy
 George Lund
 L. Spaulding
 Albert Bellows
 Prentice Flint
 Carroll Davis
 A. McDougal
 F. G. Seymore
 A. W. Paine

Assembly employees
 Chief Clerk: Edwin Coe
 1st Assistant Clerk: Walter L. Houser
 2nd Assistant Clerk: Oliver G. Munson
 Bookkeeper: Walter W. Pollock
 Engrossing Clerk: F. Z. Alexander
 Assistant Engrossing Clerks:
 E. P. Bryant
 Frances M. Hall
 Enrolling Clerk: Charles M. Durkee
 Assistant Enrolling Clerk: Sarah North
 Transcribing Clerk: Robert Hastreiter
 Assistant Transcribing Clerks: 
 Joseph Albrecht
 William Evans
 Index Clerk: James Scott
 Comparing Clerks:
 W. F. Tenney
 William Irvine
 H. T. Ames
 Clerk for the Judiciary Committee: William M. Foster
 Clerk for the Committee on Enrolled Bills: G. H. Downey
 Clerk for the Committee on Engrossed Bills: C. D. Fish
 Clerk for the Committee on State Affairs: Andrew Rohnscheib
 Clerk for the Committee on Third Reading: J. M. Craigo
 Document Clerk: H. J. Ormsby
 Custodian of the Engrossing and Enrolling Rooms: Richard O'Donnell
 Sergeant-at-Arms: F. E. Parsons
 Assistant Sergeant-at-Arms: H. N. Davis
 Postmaster: William T. Pugh
 Assistant Postmaster: John B. Nugent
 Doorkeepers:
 W. J. Zettler
 Sure Johnson
 J. K. Fisher
 C. W. Blay
 Gallery Attendants:
 Ira S. Vaughn
 H. H. Lampman
 Committee Room Attendants: 
 T. B. Rowlands
 Theodore Stenehjen
 Document Room Attendant: George L. Jones
 Gallery Attendants:
 George Hanover
 Hans C. Haller
 Porter: A. B. Lynn
 Police: F. O. Janzen
 Flagman: John Olson
 Night Watch: R. W. Jones
 Wash Room Attendant: W. B. Patterson
 Messengers:
 Lewis Olson
 Charles H. McCourt
 Lewis Skinner
 Louis Kreuger
 Willie Berg
 Robert Bissert
 George Dean
 Lewis Gregorson
 Clyde L. Kimball
 Frank Kelley 
 Eddie Dittmar
 John Bucy

References

External links
 1889: Related Documents from Wisconsin Legislature

1889 in Wisconsin
Wisconsin
Wisconsin legislative sessions